Robert DoQui (April 20, 1934 – February 9, 2008) was an American actor who starred in film and on television. He is best known for his roles as King George in the 1973 film Coffy, starring Pam Grier; as Wade in Robert Altman's 1975 film Nashville; and as Sgt. Warren Reed in the 1987 science fiction film RoboCop, the 1990 sequel RoboCop 2, and the 1993 sequel RoboCop 3. He starred on television and is also known for his voice as Pablo Robertson on the cartoon series Harlem Globetrotters from 1970 to 1973.

Early life
DoQui was born on April 20, 1934, in Stillwater, Oklahoma. He served in the U.S. Air Force before heading to Hollywood in the early 1960s.
DoQui was married to Janee Michelle from 1969 until 1978.

Career
He is best known for his roles as the flashy pimp King George in the 1973 blaxploitation film Coffy. He starred in the miniseries Centennial in 1978, and the television film The Court-Martial of Jackie Robinson in 1990. He starred as Sgt. Warren Reed in the three RoboCop films. He made guest appearances on many television series, including I Dream of Jeannie, Happy Days, The Jeffersons, Daniel Boone, Gunsmoke, Adam-12, The Parkers, Family Affair in  Take Me Out of the Ballgame  (1967 - Season 2, Episode 9) as  Officer Wilson, and Star Trek: Deep Space Nine in the season 4 episode "Sons of Mogh" as a Klingon named Noggra.

Death
DoQui died February 9, 2008, at the age of 73, from natural causes.

Filmography
 
 Taffy and the Jungle Hunter (1965)
 The Outer Limits - The Invisible Enemy (1964)
 Clarence, the Cross-Eyed Lion (1965) - Sergeant
 The Cincinnati Kid (1965) - Philly (uncredited)
 The Fortune Cookie (1966) - Man in Bar
 Doctor, You've Got to Be Kidding! (1967) - Orderly (uncredited)
 Fitzwilly (1967) - Workman (uncredited)ble
 Up Tight! (1968) - Street Speaker
 The Devil's 8 (1969) - Henry Reed
 The Red, White, and Black (1970) - Eli Brown
 Mission Impossible 1971 John Darcie (Kitara)
 The Man (1972) - Webson
 Coffy (1973) - King George
 Willie Dynamite (1974) - Baylor the Pimp (uncredited)
 Nashville (1975) - Wade
 Walking Tall Part 2 (1975) - Obra Eaker
 Buffalo Bill and the Indians, or Sitting Bull's History Lesson (1976) - The Wrangler (Oswald Dart)
 Treasure of Matecumbe (1976) - Ben
 Green Eyes (1977) - Hal
 Guyana: Crime of the Century (1979) - Oliver Ross
 I'm Dancing as Fast as I Can (1982) - Teddy
 Cloak & Dagger (1984) - Lt. Fleming
 Fast Forward (1985) - Mr. Hughes
 My Science Project (1985) - Desk Sergeant
 Good to Go (1986) - Max
 Pound Puppies (1986) (TV) - Additional voices
 RoboCop (1987) - Sergeant Warren Reed
 Mercenary Fighters (1988) - Colonel Kyemba
 Paramedics (1988) - Moses
 Miracle Mile (1988) - Fred the Cook
 RoboCop 2 (1990) - Sergeant Warren Reed
 The Court-Martial of Jackie Robinson (1990) (TV) - Top Sergeant
 Diplomatic Immunity (1991) - Ferguson 
 I Don't Buy Kisses Anymore (1992) - Fred 
 RoboCop 3 (1993) - Sergeant Warren Reed
 Short Cuts (1993) - Knute Willis 
 Walking Thunder (1997) - Gun Trader
 Glam (1997) - Don Mallon
 A Hollow Place (1998) - Alban Porter
 Positive'' (2007) - Josh (final film role)

References

External links

 
 

 Variety Obituary
 

1934 births
2008 deaths
Male actors from Oklahoma
American male film actors
American male voice actors
People from Stillwater, Oklahoma
African-American male actors
American male television actors
20th-century American male actors
21st-century American male actors
20th-century African-American people
21st-century African-American people